Verești is a commune located in Suceava County, Western Moldavia, Romania. It is composed of four villages: Bursuceni, Corocăiești, Hancea and Verești.

References

Communes in Suceava County
Localities in Western Moldavia